The Baltic Cup is an international football competition contested by the national teams of the Baltic states – Estonia, Latvia and Lithuania. Finland has also participated in the event twice as a guest and so did Iceland once. Though originally held annually the competition has been biennial since 2008. The 2020 tournament was postponed due to COVID-19 pandemic, and took place in 2021. 
It is one of the oldest national teams football tournaments in Europe after the British Home Championship,  and the oldest of the ones still organized.

History
As Estonia had unofficially declared itself the Baltic football champion in 1925, 1926 and 1927 based on matches played with Finland, Latvia, Lithuania and Poland it was decided in 1928 to organize an official tournament. Though Poland and Finland were invited to join, the tournament took place between the three Baltic nations.

The tournament was intended to improve relations between the nations, but intrigues around the organization and budget questions worked against this noble goal. The hosts always did everything to wear out their competitors. In 1933 Lithuanian hosts surprised the officials with a tour to a local brewery in the morning before the Lithuania–Latvia match. The Estonian newspaper Päevaleht reported that the Finnish referee for the match was really jolly, but did a horrible job, mostly favouring the Lithuanian hosts. The rules demanded that at least two wins were necessary to win the championship. Both Lithuania–Estonia and Lithuania–Latvia matches had been drawn but stopped due to darkness. In the team meeting Latvia demanded that Lithuania–Estonia match should be re-played first. Latvia was hoping for an advantage against a tired Lithuanian team in their match. Lithuania and Estonia disagreed, noting that Latvia had won their match against Estonia, so a Latvian win against Lithuania would grant the Latvians the championship and end the tournament. Consensus was not reached and the Latvian team left the same day. The championship was not awarded.

The feud led to the cancellation of the 1934 tournament, but the championship returned for the 1935. The rules were changed so that extra matches were now only held between leading teams if they were necessary for deciding on the championship. In 2021, for the 2020 Baltic Cup, Estonia won the Cup after a wait of 83 years.

Results

Medal summary
As of 2022.

Statistics
As of 2022. Including the 1933 tournament, but excluding the replay match played on 5 September 1933.

Top scorers per tournament

All-time top goalscorers

Hat-tricks
Since the first official tournament in 1928, 4 hat-tricks have been scored in over 50 matches of the 28 editions of the tournament. The first hat-trick was scored by Arnold Pihlak of the Estonia, playing against Lithuania on 26 July 1928; and the last was by Virginijus Baltušnikas of Lithuania, playing against Latvia on 12 July 1992. No player has ever scored two hat-tricks is the Baltic Cup and no player has ever scored more than 3 goals in a single Baltic Cup match.

List

See also
 Under-21 Baltic Cup
 Under-19 Baltic Cup
 Under-17 Baltic Cup
 Baltic Futsal Cup
 Women's Baltic Cup
 Women's Under-19 Baltic Cup
 Women's Under-17 Baltic Cup
 Women's Under-15 Baltic Cup

References

External links
 RSSSF: Baltic Cup overview

 
1928 establishments in Europe
Biennial sporting events
International association football competitions hosted by Estonia
International association football competitions hosted by Latvia
International association football competitions hosted by Lithuania
International association football competitions in Europe
International men's association football invitational tournaments
Recurring sporting events established in 1928
Sport in the Baltic states